Awad bin Mohammed Al-Qarni was a prominent reformist law professor in Saudi Arabia who was arrested and condemned to death for offenses including owning a Twitter account and using WhatsApp to share messages deemed "hostile" to the kingdom.

Biography 
Awad Al-Qarni was born in 1957 and raised in Balqarn governorate in Saudi Arabia's southwestern 'Asir Region.  Al-Qarni was a professor at Imam Muhammad bin Saud Islamic University and King Khalid University, who focused on law and has written several books on Islamic jurisprudence and the Palestinian issue.  According to the International Union of Muslim Scholars website, he was the head of the Saudi Arabian Union on neuro-linguistic programming.

Background, arrest, and sentencing 

In September 2017, Al-Qarni was arrested and charged with hostile actions against Saudi Arabia. According to The Guardian newspaper, Saudi-Controlled media described Al-Qarni as a dangerous preacher, but the dissenters believed that he was an important intellectual on social media, including Twitter, with more than 2 million followers. Al-Qarni was arrested in 2007 and condemned to 15 years in jail in 2011 during a trial against the "Jeddah reformers".

On 15 January 2023, The Guardian reported on the execution of Al-Qarni for offenses including owning a Twitter account and using WhatsApp to share messages deemed "hostile" to the kingdom. The Details of the news were revealed by his son Nasser al-Qarni in a video, who withdrew from Saudi Arabia last year and is living in the UK. Nasser also said he withdrew from the Gulf Kingdom of the threat of imprisonment or execution by the Saudi authorities if he spoke about his father.

Criticisms and reactions 
The United States government has accused Saudi Arabia used of big technologies such as Twitter and WhatsApp to suppress its critics. Meanwhile, Saudi Arabia's sovereign wealth fund the Public Investment Fund from 2018 to 2022 raised their stake in US social media platforms Twitter and Meta Platforms, the company that owns Facebook and WhatsApp.

Jeed Basyouni, the head of Middle East and North African advocacy at Reprieve, said that the kingdom has sought to present an international image of investment in technology, modern infrastructure, sports, and entertainment through posting about the kingdom's investment on Facebook and Twitter, while that scholars and academics, including Al-Qarni, are facing the death penalty by the government of Bin Salman for tweeting and expressing their opinions.

Khalid Aljabri, son of Saad bin Khalid Al Jabri said: It's more than abhorrent that a prominent law professor faces the death penalty for using Twitter while an FBI fugitive is wanted for allegedly selling the personal information of Saudi dissidents to the Saudi government by breaking into Twitter's headquarters ( Ahmad Al-Mutairi ), acquires a Netflix-sponsored VIP invitation to attend a Saudi government event.

See also

2016 Saudi Arabia mass execution
Human rights in Saudi Arabia
2018 Women's Rights Crackdown
Dina Ali Lasloom – imprisoned Saudi asylum seeker
Fahad al-Butairi – abducted in Jordan and taken to be imprisoned in Saudi Arabia
Hamza Kashgari – pro-democracy activist and columnist imprisoned for blasphemy
Israa al-Ghomgham – Saudi Qatif conflict human rights activist
Loujain al-Hathloul – Saudi women's rights activist
Manal al-Sharif – Saudi human rights activist
Mishaal bint Fahd bin Mohammed Al Saud – Saudi princess executed for alleged adultery
Princesses Jawaher, Sahar, Hala and Maha – Saudi princesses under house arrest
Raif Badawi – imprisoned Saudi dissident, writer and activist
Samar Badawi – imprisoned Saudi activist
Sheikh Baqir al-Nimr – dissident cleric executed for starting riots in Qatif
Justice Against Sponsors of Terrorism Act
List of solved missing person cases
Saudi Arabian involvement in the Syrian Civil War
Saudi Arabian-led intervention in Yemen

References 

20th-century Saudi Arabian writers
21st-century Saudi Arabian writers
Saudi Arabian expatriates in the United States
Saudi Arabian newspaper editors
Saudi Arabian Muslims
Missing person cases in Saudi Arabia
Saudi Arabian prisoners and detainees
Saudi Arabian people murdered abroad
Assassinated Saudi Arabian journalists
People murdered in Saudi Arabia
Saudi Arabian dissidents
Male murder victims
1957 births
Living people